Raghunath Pandey (March 8, 1922 – September 24, 2001) was an Indian politician and businessperson from Muzaffarpur, Bihar. He served as the Member of the Legislative Assembly in Muzaffarpur from 1980 to 1995 by Indian National Congress ticket. Pandey lost the 1991 general elections from Muzaffarpur to George Fernandes. He filed a case in Patna High Court and finally he won but till then the Parliament was dissolved. He again lost in the 1995 assembly elections.

Pandey served as the mayor of Muzaffarpur Municipal corporation for ten years. He also served as a minister in Satyendra Narayan Sinha's cabinet. Prior to entering politics, he had several businesses in Muzaffarpur including transport and cinema halls. Pandey setup several colleges including Sri Krishna Medical College and Hospital and Homoeopathic Medical College & Hospital in the city.

References

External links
 Sri Krishna Medical College and Hospital

Indian National Congress politicians from Bihar
People from Muzaffarpur district
1922 births
2001 deaths
Bihar MLAs 1980–1985
Bihar MLAs 1985–1990
Bihar MLAs 1990–1995
State cabinet ministers of Bihar
Businesspeople from Bihar